Suchodolski (feminine: Suchodolska; plural: Suchodolscy) is a surname. Notable people with the surname include:

 January Suchodolski (1797–1875), Polish painter and Army officer
 Bogdan Suchodolski (1903–1992), Polish philosopher and historian
 Rajnold Suchodolski (1804–1831), Polish poet
 Zdzisław Suchodolski (1835–1908), Polish painter

See also
 

Polish-language surnames